Louis Pasteur Vallery-Radot (3 May 1886, Paris - 9 October 1970, Paris) was a French physician, biographer of his grandfather Louis Pasteur and editor of Pasteur's complete works.  In 1936 he was elected as a member of the Académie Nationale de Médecine.

References

1886 births
1970 deaths
20th-century French physicians
French medical historians
French biographers
French male non-fiction writers
20th-century French male writers